This article lists political parties in Eswatini. The status of political parties in Eswatini is not clearly defined.

Current parties 
 African United Democratic Party (AUDP)
 Communist Party of Swaziland (CPS)
 Economic Freedom Fighters of Swaziland (EFF)
 Inhlava Party (previously Inhlava Forum)
Maxter Political Party 
 Ngwane National Liberatory Congress (NNLC)
 Ngwane Socialist Revolutionary Party (NGWASOREP)
 Owen Murray Party 
 Peoples' United Democratic Movement (PUDEMO)
 Sive Siyinqaba National Movement
  Swaziland Liberation Movement (SWALIMO) 
 Swazi Democratic Party (SWADEPA)
 Swaziland National Front (SWANAFRO)
 Swaziland National Progressive Party (SNPP)

Source:

Historical parties 
 Imbokodvo National Movement
 Inhlava Political Movement
 Mbandzeni National Convention
 Sive Siyinqaba, Sibahle Sinje Political Movement
 Swaziland Communist Party (SWACOPA)
 Swaziland Democratic Front
 Swaziland Independence Front
 Swaziland Progressive Party
 Swaziland United Front
 Umbane Movement
 United Swaziland Association

See also 
 Politics of Eswatini
 List of political parties by country

References 

Eswatini
 
Eswatini
Political parties
Parties